The following lists events that happened during 2007 in Yemen.

Incumbents
President: Ali Abdullah Saleh

Events

January
 January 28 - Six soldiers have been killed and 20 injured in attacks by Shia militants in the north of Yemen, officials say.

September
 September 30 - A dormant volcano erupts on Jabal al-Tair Island, a Yemeni island in the Red Sea.

References

 
Years of the 21st century in Yemen
Yemen
Yemen
2000s in Yemen